Dobs at the Shore is a 1914 American silent comedy film featuring Oliver Hardy.

Plot

Cast
 Frank Griffin as Jemula Heckla (as Frank C. Griffin)
 Oliver Hardy as Meggie Heckla (as Babe Hardy)
 Frances Ne Moyer as Helen Martin
 Raymond McKee as Count Casco
 Don Ferrando as Bob Fisher

See also
 List of American films of 1914
 Oliver Hardy filmography

External links

1914 films
American silent short films
American black-and-white films
1914 comedy films
1914 short films
Films directed by Frank Griffin
Silent American comedy films
American comedy short films
1910s American films